Definition of Real is the second studio album by rapper Plies. It was released on June 10, 2008. Guest appearances include Ne-Yo, J. Holiday, Keyshia Cole, Trey Songz, Jamie Foxx and The-Dream. The album garnered mixed reviews from critics who questioned Plies' lyricism and vocal work. Definition of Real debuted at number 2 on the Billboard 200 and spawned two singles: "Bust It Baby Pt. 2" and "Please Excuse My Hands".

Critical reception

Definition of Real received mixed reviews from music critics who questioned Plies' abilities as a capable rapper. At Metacritic, which assigns a normalized rating out of 100 to reviews from mainstream critics, the album received an average score of 59, based on 5 reviews.

Khalid Strickland of IGN gave high praise to the album's hyper-violent gangster material for displaying Plies' growth as a rapper, concluding that "Overall, with its bumping production and street sensibility, Definition of Real is a tight-knit piece of work that stiff-arms the dreaded "sophomore slump." Patrick Taylor of RapReviews said that despite being a transition to his next album and containing lightweight R&B hits that clashed with his thug image, he praised the album for delivering street tracks that we're interlaced with introspection, concluding that "As it stands, Definition of Real may not be an instant classic, but it isn't a sophomore slump either, and there are signs that there could be more to Plies beyond his drawl and his love of female reproductive organs." AllMusic's David Jeffries also criticized the album's inclusion of radio songs but felt that Plies added more lyrical clarity to his goon bravado, saying that "The compelling three-quarters of Definition of Real that seems to have crawled out of the gutter proves that Plies is best off when he does it the ski-mask way."

Jon Caramanica of The New York Times praised Plies for maintaining his charisma when delivering both vindictive vulgarities and conscience sincerity despite the album not being as strong as The Real Testament, saying that it "lacks some of that album's rawness, but is still strong, thanks to his shockingly literal and unforgiving rhymes." Roman Cooper of HipHopDX felt the album's production had a cohesive sound but criticized Plies' inability to move past typical gangsta material and into more introspective tracks like "Somebody Loves You" and "1 Day", saying that "Seemingly incapable of switching up his flow or creating vivid imagery, it's important to realize that in listening to Definition of Real, you won't be getting Ready to Die." Nathan Slavik of DJBooth was mixed on the album, saying that he was put off by the expletive-laden lyrics heard throughout the hardcore tracks and love songs but that it would attract more to the female demographic. In MSN Music, Robert Christgau panned the album's overly violent and misogynistic content.

Sales
Definition of Real debuted on the Billboard 200 at number two selling 214,902 copies in the first week of release, making it his second #2 album and highest first week sales, beating his debut album The Real Testament, which sold 96,000 in its first week. It was released on the same day as Lil Wayne's album Tha Carter III. It was the second best-selling hip hop album at the time in 2008 until it was beat by first week sales of The Game's album LAX, Young Jeezy's album The Recession and Lil Wayne's Tha Carter III. It was the fifth fast-selling hip hop album of 2008, until T.I.'s sixth studio album Paper Trail became the second in 2008, putting the album the sixth fastest selling hip hop album of 2008. In celebration of the album he renamed the date Goon 10th, instead of June 10 As of October 2008, the album has sold approximately 524,000 copies in the United States. It has become the rapper's second album to go gold and is his most successful sales of album to date.

Singles
The first single is "Bust It Baby (Part. 2)" featuring Ne-Yo. It is currently his biggest hit single to date, peaking at number seven on the US Billboard Hot 100 chart. The second single is "Please Excuse My Hands" featuring Jamie Foxx, and The-Dream.

There is also a music video for the song "Who Hotter Than Me", released June 10, 2008.

Track listing

Sample Credits
 "Somebody (Loves You)" contains a sample of "Somebody Loves You Baby", written by Eugene Curry and Walter Sigler, as performed by Patti LaBelle.
 "Bust It Baby (Part 2)" contains a sample of "Come Back to Me", written by Janet Jackson, James Harris, and Terry Lewis, as performed by Janet Jackson.

See also
2008 in hip hop

Charts

Weekly charts

Year-end charts

Certifications

References

2008 albums
Albums produced by DJ Frank E
Albums produced by Drumma Boy
Albums produced by J. R. Rotem
Albums produced by Kane Beatz
Plies (rapper) albums
Atlantic Records albums